Dallas County Schools is a school district headquartered in Selma, Alabama, United States. The district serves unincorporated areas in Dallas County, Alabama and most municipalities; residents of the City of Selma are zoned to Selma City Schools.

Schools

Middle and high schools
 Keith Middle-High School (Unincorporated area)

High schools
 Dallas County High School (Unincorporated area)
 Southside High School (Unincorporated area)

Middle schools
 Martin Middle School (Valley Grande)
 Tipton Middle School (Unincorporated area)

Elementary schools
K-6
 Brantley Elementary School (Unincorporated area)
 Shiloh Elementary School (Unincorporated area)
 J. E. Terry Elementary (Unincorporated area)
 Valley Grande Elementary (Valley Grande)
3-6
 Five Points Elementary School (Unincorporated area)
3-5
 Bruce K. Craig Elementary School (Unincorporated area)
K-2
 Salem Primary School (Unincorporated area)
 Southside Primary School (Unincorporated area)

Other
 Career Tech Center (Unincorporated area)

Failing schools
Statewide testing ranks the schools in Alabama. Those in the bottom six percent are listed as "failing." As of early 2018, three local schools were included in this category.
 Keith Middle-High School
 Southside High School
 Tipton Durant Middle School

References

External links
 Official website
Schools
School districts in Alabama